The 1980 Connecticut Huskies football team represented the University of Connecticut in the 1980 NCAA Division I-AA football season.  The Huskies were led by fourth year head coach Walt Nadzak, and completed the season with a record of 7–3.

Schedule

References

Connecticut
UConn Huskies football seasons
Connecticut Huskies football